The Puritan (French: Le puritain) is a 1938 French crime film directed by Jeff Musso and starring Pierre Fresnay, Jean-Louis Barrault and Viviane Romance.

The film's art direction was by Henri Ménessier and Serge Piménoff.

Cast
 Pierre Fresnay as Le commissaire Lavan 
 Jean-Louis Barrault as Francis Ferriter  
 Viviane Romance as Molly  
 Louis-Jacques Boucot as Monsieur Kelly 
 Mady Berry as Madame Kelly  
 Alexandre Rignault as Le docteur O'Leary  
 Fréhel 
 Ludmilla Pitoëff as La tante de Thérésa  
 Alla Donell as Thérésa Burke  
 Rosita Montenegro 
 Marcel Vallée 
 Georges Flamant as Callaghan  
 Pedro Elviro as Un agent de la Sûreté  
 Charblay 
 Jean Tissier 
 Léon Bary 
 Pierre Labry
 Marcel Delaître as Le prêtre  
 Marthe Mellot as Madame Ferriter  
 Geneviève Sorya as La gourgandine  
 Edmond Van Daële
 Paul Asselin
 Maurice Maillot

References

Bibliography 
 Alfred Krautz. International directory of cinematographers set- and costume designers in film. Saur, 1983.

External links 
 

1938 films
French crime comedy films
1930s French-language films
Films based on Liam O'Flaherty's works
1930s crime comedy films
1938 comedy films
1930s French films